The 1990–91 National Football League, known for sponsorship reasons as the Royal Liver Assurance National Football League, was the 60th staging of the National Football League (NFL), an annual Gaelic football tournament for the Gaelic Athletic Association county teams of Ireland.

Dublin defeated Kildare in the final.

Format 

1990-91 was the final season of this league structure. The league was re-formatted for 1991-92.

Divisions
 Division One: 8 teams
 Division Two: 8 teams
 Division Three: 16 teams. Split into two regional groups of 8 (North and South)

Round-robin format
Each team played every other team in its division (or group where the division is split) once, either home or away.

Points awarded
2 points were awarded for a win and 1 for a draw.

Titles
Teams in all three divisions competed for the National Football League title.

Knockout stage qualifiers
 Division One: first 4 teams
 Division Two: first 2 teams
 Division Three (North):  first team
 Division Three (South):  first team

Knockout phase structure
In the quarter-finals, the match-ups were as follows
 Quarter-final 1: First-placed team in Division One v First-placed team in Division Three (South)
 Quarter-final 2: Second-placed team in Division One v First-placed team in Division Three (North)
 Quarter-final 3: Third-placed team in Division One v Second-placed team in Division Two
 Quarter-final 4: Fourth-placed team in Division One v First-placed team in Division Two

The semi-final match-ups are
 Semi-final 1: Winner Quarter-final 1 v Winner Quarter-final 4
 Semi-final 2: Winner Quarter-final 2 v Winner Quarter-final 3

The final match-up is: Winner Semi-final 1 v Winner Semi-final 2.

Promotion and relegation

Owing to the re-structure of the league, promotion and relegation did not take place in the same manner as it did under the same structure in other years.

 Division One: No relegation. All 8 teams placed in Division One of the 1991–92 NFL.
 Division Two: top 7 teams placed in Division One of the 1991–92 NFL. Bottom team placed in Division Two of the 1991–92 NFL.
 Division Three (North): group winners promoted to Division One of the 1991–92 NFL. Group runners up play-off for the third promotion slot from Division Three to Division One of the 1991–92 NFL. Remaining teams in the group placed in Division Two of the 1991–92 NFL.
 Division Three (South):  group winners promoted to Division One of the 1991–92 NFL. Group runners up play-off for the third promotion slot from Division Three to Division One of the 1991–92 NFL. Remaining teams in the group placed in Division Two of the 1991–92 NFL.

Separation of teams on equal points

In the event that teams finish on equal points, then a play-off will be used to determine group placings if necessary, i.e. where to decide relegation places or quarter-finalists.

League Phase Tables and Results

Division One

Division Two

Division Two play-offs

Table

Division Three

Division Three promotion play-off

Division Three (North) table

Division Three (South) table

Knockout stages

Quarter-finals

Semi-finals

Final

References

National Football League
National Football League
National Football League (Ireland) seasons